This article details the Catalans Dragons rugby league football club's 2013 season. This is the 18th season of the Super League era.

Table

2013 fixtures and results

2013 Engage Super League

Challenge Cup

Playoffs

2013 transfers in/out

In

Out

References

External links
Catalan on Sky Sports
Catalan on Super League Site
BBC Sport-Rugby League

Catalans Dragons seasons
Catalans Dragons
2013 in French rugby league